Serenity is a live album by saxophonist Stan Getz which was recorded at the Jazzhus Montmartre in 1987 and released on the EmArcy label in 1991.

Reception

The Allmusic review by Scott Yanow said "From the same sessions that resulted in Anniversary, Stan Getz celebrated his 60th birthday as he had his 50th, with a gig at the Cafe Montmartre in Copenhagen. ...Getz (who only had four years left) plays in peak form, really stretching out... His solo on "I Remember You" is particularly strong".

Track listing
 "On Green Dolphin Street" ( Bronisław Kaper, Ned Washington) - 13:38
 "Voyage" (Kenny Barron) - 12:05
 "Falling in Love" (Victor Feldman) - 9:05
 "I Remember You" (Victor Schertzinger, Johnny Mercer) - 10:08
 "I Love You" (Cole Porter) - 10:57

Personnel 
Stan Getz - tenor saxophone 
Kenny Barron - piano
Rufus Reid - bass
Victor Lewis - drums

References 

1991 live albums
Stan Getz live albums
EmArcy Records live albums
Albums recorded at Jazzhus Montmartre